Borgarfjarðarbrú ("Borgarfjörður bridge") is the second longest bridge in Iceland, after Skeiðarárbrú. It crosses Borgarfjörður, linking Borgarnes to Route 1 (the Ring Road) and connecting the town with other parts of Iceland. It spans 520 m and was opened on 13 September 1981, with repairs being done in 2012.

References

Bridges in Iceland
Borgarbyggð